Carsten Wolf (born 26 August 1964) is an East German racing cyclist, who competed for the SC Dynamo Berlin / Sportvereinigung (SV) Dynamo. He won the silver medal at the Olympic games in Seoul 1988.

References 

1964 births
Living people
East German male cyclists
Olympic cyclists of East Germany
Cyclists at the 1988 Summer Olympics
Olympic silver medalists for East Germany
Sportspeople from Potsdam
Olympic medalists in cycling
Medalists at the 1988 Summer Olympics
Cyclists from Brandenburg
People from Bezirk Potsdam